The Islamic prophet Muhammad went to the city of Ta’if in the year 619 AD (10th Nabvi) .

History

Previous events
Previously the preaching of Islam by Muhammad had been confined to Mecca, and his success with Abu Bakr on  during the Year of Sorrow his main source of Ta’if to invite the people there to Islam.

Leaders of Ta’if
The Prophet Muhammad was received by the three (Abd Yalayl, Mas'ud and Habib, their father was Amr Bin Ummaya Ath Thaqafi) chiefs of the local tribes of Ta’if and they let him freely have his say, however, they paid little heed to his message. After a while they even showed signs of apprehension lest his welcome in Ta’if might embroil them with the Meccans, so they left him to be dealt with by street urchins and the riff raff of the town.

Rejection
By rejecting Muhammad's religion, the people of Ta'if ordered their children to throw rocks and stones at Muhammad and Zayd ibn Harithah to make them leave the city and never come back. Muhammad and Zayd ibn Harithah were finally turned out by mocking and jeering crowds. The rocks that were thrown at Muhammad and Zayd by the Ta'if children caused them to bleed. Both were wounded and bleeding as they left Ta’if behind them. Muhammad  bled so profusely from the stoning that his feet became clotted to his shoes and he was wounded badly.

Orchard 
Once Muhammad and Zayd ibn Harithah were outside the city walls, Muhammad  almost collapsed. They went a short distance outside of the town and stopped in an orchard that belonged to Utaba and Sheba.

The owners of the orchard had seen Muhammad  being persecuted in Mecca and on this occasion they felt some sympathy toward their fellow townsman. They sent a slave (named Addas) who took Muhammad  into his hut, dressed his wounds, and let him rest and recuperate until he felt strong enough to resume his journey across the rough terrain between Ta’if and Mecca. It was there that the Angel Gabriel came to him with the Angel of the Mountains and said that if Muhammad wanted, he would blow the mountains over the people of Ta’if (or crush the people of Ta'if in between the mountains).

Muhammad  prayed:

The owners also told their Christian slave named Addas from Nineveh to give a tray of grapes to the visitors. 

Muhammad  took the grape and before putting it into his mouth he recited what has become the Muslim grace: "In the name of God-the Most Compassionate, Most Merciful" (Arabic Bismillah ar-Rahman, ar-Raheem). Addas became curious and inquired about the identity of Muhammad who presented himself. The conversation that ensued led Addas to declare his acceptance of Islam, so that Muhammad's  journey to Ta’if did not prove entirely fruitless.

He stayed preaching to the common people for 10 days.

Return
Muhammad sent Zayd to seek asylum for him among  4 nobles in the city. Three of them, `Abd Yalil ibn `Abd Kalal and then Akhnas ibn Shariq and Suhayl ibn Amr, refused but the fourth one, Mut‘im ibn ‘Adi, responded.

Mut‘im ordered his sons, nephews and other young men of his clan to put on their battle-dress and then marched, in full panoply of war, at their head, out of the city. He brought Muhammad with him, first into the precincts of the Kaaba where the latter made the customary seven circuits, and then escorted him to his home.

References

Angelic apparitions
Life of Muhammad g